Body of Evidence is a psychological thriller film directed by Roy Campanella II and starring Margot Kidder and Barry Bostwick. It premiered on CBS Network in January 1988. It was filmed in Alberta, Canada

Premise
An unsuspecting nurse (Margot Kidder) fears her forensic pathologist second-husband (Barry Bostwick) may be the psychotic serial strangler behind a recent rash of grisly murders.  A local police detective (Tony LoBianco) does his best to unravel clues that may prevent future slayings.

Plot
There is a serial killer loose in the area.  He is killing young girls by garrotting them with a wire noose.  The motive is unknown and therein lies the danger because it is then almost impossible to find out who is behind the crimes.  The pathologist involved in most of the murder investigations, discovers a number of clues.  He knows that the murderer is Afro-American, left-handed and sterile.  He deducted all this from his examinations of the bodies.  His wife, Carol (Margot Kidder), a nurse, organizes a neighborhood watch protection group because of the shocking slayings.

As the police detective delves deeper and deeper into the murders, he keeps coming up against a brick wall.  Every advantage he gets is lost because as the list of victims grows, the composite sketch changes with each new witness, as if the killer had the gift of always keeping one step ahead of the detective's investigation.

As the intensity of the killing increases, the need to catch the killer becomes more and more important.  This is because Carol - who is working closely with the police - finds reasons to fear for her own safety.  All the victims resemble her, and the clues appear to point to her second husband, the forensic police pathologist involved in the investigation whose increasingly bizarre behaviour seems to implicate him even further.

Cast
Margot Kidder ...  Carol Dwyer 
Barry Bostwick ...  Alex Dwyer 
Caroline Kava ...  Jean 
Jennifer Barbour ...  Jessie 
David Hayward ...  Jack 
Tony Lo Bianco ...  Evan Campbell 
Debbie Carr ...  Lisa 
Peter Bibby ...  Intern 
Garwin Sanford ...  Doctor 
Georgie Collins ...  Lady in Hospital 
Don S. Davis ...  Gun Salesman 
Blu Mankuma ...  Sawyer 
Don MacKay ...  J.P. 
Bill Croft ...  Construction Man #1 
Karen Tilly ...  Stephanie

References

External links

1988 television films
1988 films
1980s psychological thriller films
Films shot in Alberta
American serial killer films
CBS network films
1980s American films